(March 11, 1928 – October 10, 2011) was a Japanese kabuki performer noted for his onnagata roles.

Biography
His real name Nakamura Eijirô, in 1967 Nakamura became the seventh person to adopt the Nakamura Shikan name. In 1996 he became recognized as a Living National Treasures of Japan, and in 2006 he became a Person of Cultural Merit. Nakamura
is a grandson of Nakamura Utaemon V.

See also 
 Living National Treasures of Japan

References 

Kabuki actors
Recipients of the Order of Culture
Living National Treasures of Japan
1928 births
2011 deaths
Cross-gender male actors